1949 in philosophy

Events

Publications 
 Karl Jaspers, The Origin and Goal of History (1949); Note: Jaspers coined the term Axial Age. 
 Aldo Leopold, A Sand County Almanac (1949)
 Gilbert Ryle, The Concept of Mind (1949)
 Joseph Campbell, The Hero with a Thousand Faces (1949)
 Jean Fourastié, Le Grand Espoir du XXe siècle (1949, no English translation available?)
 Simone de Beauvoir, The Second Sex (1949)

Philosophical fiction 
 George Orwell, Nineteen Eighty-Four (1949)

Births 
 January 1 - Ljubodrag Simonović, Serbian philosopher, author and basketball player
 January 2 - Iris Marion Young (died 2006)
 January 11 - Jean-Paul Enthoven, French philosopher and publisher
 March 21 - Slavoj Žižek, Slovenian cultural theorist 
 April 13 - Christopher Hitchens, British-American journalist (died 2011)
 June 30 - Alain Finkielkraut 
 July 18 - Axel Honneth

Deaths 
 November 23 - Gustav Radbruch (born 1878)

References 

Philosophy
20th-century philosophy
Philosophy by year